Silene  samojedorum is a flowering plant in the family Caryophyllaceae.

Distribution
This species is present in Russia, Western Siberia, Central Siberia and Russian Far East.

Description
Silene samojedorum is a perennial herbaceous plant with showy pink flowers. The flowering time lasts from late spring to late summer.

Bibliography
Flora of China Editorial Committee. 2001. Flora of China (Caryophyllaceae through Lardizabalaceae). 6: 1–512. In C. Y. Wu, P. H. Raven & D. Y. Hong (eds.) Fl. China. Science Press & Missouri Botanical Garden Press, Beijing & St. Louis
Malyschev, L.I. & Peschkova, G.A. (eds.) (2003). Flora of Siberia 6: 1–301. Scientific Publishers, Inc., Enfield, Plymouth.
Tutin, T.G. & al. (eds.) (1993). Flora Europaea ed. 2, 1: 1–581. Cambridge University Press.

References

samojedorum
Flora of Asia